The 224th Sustainment Brigade is a sustainment brigade of the United States Army and the California Army National Guard.

Service history
In April 2010 the Brigade deployed for a scheduled year-long deployment to Iraq.

The Brigade was relieved by the 38th Sustainment Brigade likely in December 2011.

Current structure
 224th Sustainment Brigade
 Special Troops Battalion
 Headquarters and Headquarters Company
 240th Signal Company
 224th Financial Management Support Unit
 1498th Transportation Company
 746th Combat Sustainment Support Battalion
 Headquarters and Headquarters Company
 756th Transportation Company
 1072nd Transportation Company
 1114th Transportation Company
 1st Battalion, 144th Field Artillery Regiment
 Headquarters and Headquarters Battery
 Battery A
 Battery B
 11th Forward Support Company (Attached)
749th Combat Sustainment Support Battalion
2668th Transportation Company
2632th Transportation Company
1113th Transportation Company
118th Maintenance Company

References

224